The Girl on the Pier is a 1953 British crime film produced by John Temple-Smith, directed by Lance Comfort and starring Veronica Hurst, Ron Randell, Brian Roper, Campbell Singer and Anthony Valentine.

Plot
Inspector Chubb (Charles Victor) dictates a warrant for arrest for murder. He then takes a car to the railway station, where he catches a train to Brighton with his wife and young son. Cathy, their teenage daughter, chats up a young crime reporter, Ronnie Hall, at the bar.

On Brighton Pier, ex-convict Nick Lane (Ron Randell), who has recently started working on the pier with a dance band as clarinetist and vocalist, flirts with Rita Hammond, talking of their assignation the night before and arranging to meet her at the dance that night. Nick surprises Rita by greeting her husband Joe Hammond as an old friend. The men go to Joe's office and Nick challenges Joe regarding the missing loot from a previous crime. He reveals that Hammond used to be called Harper. In the Chamber of Horrors section of Joe's Wax House, young Charlie Chubb (Anthony Valentine) hears part of the conversation. His mum (Marjorie Rhodes) finds him still hanging around the pierside amusements.

At the dance on the pier, Nick hooks up with Rita and gets inside information on Joe. Hammond spots them kissing under the pier. After Rita leaves, they fight. Nick wins and also threatens to blackmail him.

Joe demands that Rita does not see Nick again. While Rita sees Nick on the beach, Joe empties the safe and also takes out a revolver. Charlie is asked to take a note to the band singer. Charlie thinks he sees Joe kill Rita and tells his dad, but Rita is still alive.

Nick tells the young reporter that Hammond is Harper.

The reporter, Cathy, and Charlie go to the library and find newspaper cuttings connecting Nick to "Harper" in a robbery 4 years before. Charlie saw a notice for a rehearsal and believes the murder will happen that night. Charlie tails Hammond/Harper, and the reporter tells his dad their theory.

Despite the warning in advance, Nick gets shot by Hammond (who has disguised himself as a clown in his waxworks) without police intervention. Rita arrives and faints. When the police arrive, Hammond "hides in plain sight" as a waxwork, but Charlie sees him move. A pursuit throughout the pier ensues, ending with Hammond falling into the sea and drowning.

Cast
 Veronica Hurst as Rita Hammond
 Ron Randell as Nick Lane
 Charles Victor as Inspector Chubb
 Marjorie Rhodes as Mrs. Chubb
 Campbell Singer as Joe Hammond
 Eileen Moore as Cathy Chubb
 Brian Roper as Ronnie Hall
 Anthony Valentine	as Charlie Chubb

Critical reception
Allmovie wrote that the film "doesn't pretend to be a classic; on its own terms, it's an agreeable 65 minutes out of your life."

References

External links

1953 films
1953 crime films
Films directed by Lance Comfort
British crime films
British black-and-white films
1950s English-language films
1950s British films